Road 86 is a route connecting south-west to southeast from Kerman to Ahvaz.

References

External links 

 Iran road map on Young Journalists Club

Roads in Iran